The Hayden Rooming House, also known as the Hayden Inn, at 295 S. Poplar St. in Hayden, Colorado, was built in 1910.  It was listed on the National Register of Historic Places in 1999.

It is significant for its association with early commercial development in Hayden.

References

Hotels in Colorado
National Register of Historic Places in Routt County, Colorado
Residential buildings completed in 1910
Ornamental block buildings